James E. "J. J." Johnson (born April 20, 1974) is a former American football running back of the National Football League (NFL). He was selected by the Miami Dolphins in the second round of the 1999 NFL Draft. He played college football at East Mississippi Community College before transferring to Mississippi State.  While at Mississippi State, Johnson won the Conerly Trophy in 1998.  Johnson has also been a member of the Cleveland Browns.

NFL career statistics

Regular season

Playoffs

References

1974 births
Living people
American football fullbacks
Cleveland Browns players
East Mississippi Lions football players
Miami Dolphins players
Mississippi State Bulldogs football players
Sportspeople from Mobile, Alabama
Players of American football from Alabama